Billy Sánchez (born 1964) is a former Sergeant-at-Arms of the Senate of Puerto Rico. Sánchez has served in the position since January 2009. Before that, he served as Director of the Office of Public Housing.

Early years and studies
Sánchez was born in 1964 in Bayamón, Puerto Rico. He received a Bachelor's degree in Educational Technology from the Bayamón Central University. He also received another degree in Security and Protection from the University of Puerto Rico.

Public service
Sánchez began working as a public servant in his hometown of Bayamón, under the mayoralty of Ramón Luis Rivera. During the governorship of Pedro Rosselló, he also served as Director of the Office of Public Housing.

In January 2009, Sánchez was appointed by Thomas Rivera Schatz as Sergeant-at-Arms of the 24th Senate of Puerto Rico.

Personal life
Sánchez has two sons.

In 2012, Sánchez was involved in a scandal of alleged domestic abuse when he allegedly threatened an ex-partner. As a result, Sánchez had his license to carry weapons revoked, and seven firearms were taken from his possession.
Sanchez Billy marries for second time with young Colombian Yuliana Andrea Zapata

References

External links
Official biography

1966 births
Living people
People from Bayamón, Puerto Rico
University of Puerto Rico alumni